The Islamic Society of North America (ISNA) is a nonprofit organization based in Plainfield, Indiana. It provides a number of programs and services to the Muslim community and broader society. ISNA holds an annual convention which is generally regarded as the largest annual gathering of Muslims in the US.

History
ISNA traces its origins to a meeting of a group of international students at the University of Illinois Urbana-Champaign in 1963, during which the Muslim Students Association was formed. ISNA regards the MSA's 1963 convention at the University of Illinois Urbana-Champaign as its first one. Present-day ISNA was founded in 1982 through a joint effort of four organizations: The Muslim Students Association of the US and Canada (The MSA), Islamic Medical Association (IMA), the Association of Muslim Social Scientists (AMSS), and the Association of Muslim Scientists and Engineers (AMSE) - to create a community-oriented organization due to the changing nature of the growing Muslim community. Many of the leaders of these four founding organizations took on roles in the newly formed ISNA. In 1983, ISNA's multi-million dollar headquarters was completed in Plainfield, Indiana, using funds raised in part from international sources. On August 30, 2013, Tahera Ahmad became the first woman to open an ISNA convention with a recitation of the Quran, which she did at the 50th Annual ISNA Convention in front of a mixed-gender audience.

Goals

ISNA's vision is "to be an exemplary and unifying Islamic organization in North America that contributes to the betterment of the Muslim community and society at large." ISNA provides a common platform for presenting Islam, supports Muslim communities, develops educational, social and outreach programs, and fosters good relations with other religious communities, and civic and service organizations.

Services

ISNA provides various services for Muslims in North America. Services include annual conventions, education forums, youth programs, chaplain support, scholarships, an award-winning magazine, and more. ISNA also offers individual membership on an annual basis and lifetime basis for sustaining donors.

ISNA's annual convention, typically on the Labor Day weekend in early September, is generally regarded as the largest annual gathering of American Muslims in the United States. The convention is often held in Chicago, Illinois, where it features Islamic lectures, discussions, debates, nasheeds, and Muslim comedy. A notable comedian who has repeatedly performed at ISNA is Azhar Usman. In 2012, the ISNA Convention was held in Washington, D.C. Deputy U.S. Attorney General, Thomas Perez, addressed the 2012 Convention, and other prominent representatives of the White House have attended in the past, including Valerie Jarrett, President Obama's Senior Advisor for Engagement and International Affairs in 2009  and Homeland Security Secretary Jeh Johnson in 2016. Joe Biden also addressed the ISNA convention in 2020, prior to his presidency. 

Islamic Horizons is ISNA's bi-monthly publication, which delivers cutting-edge commentary on global issues and current events. It also highlights the strides being made by American Muslims in various fields.

Organizational structure
ISNA is composed of a General Assembly, Board of Directors, Executive Committee, Directorate, Advisory Council, and Committees.

Interfaith dialogue

ISNA invited Rabbi Eric Yoffie, president of the Union for Reform Judaism, to speak before its 44th annual meeting (2007). Reform Judaism is the largest Jewish denomination in the US. Yoffie denounced "opportunists" who demonise Islam, and called for an end to racial profiling and legal discrimination against Muslim Americans. Yoffie drew frequent applause, and a standing ovation. David Harris, executive director of the American Jewish Committee, criticized Yoffie.

ISNA also invited Rick Warren to address the 2009 annual ISNA convention. Rabbis, evangelical and Catholic leaders were also present.

ISNA has participated in interfaith dialogue with the U.S. Bishops' Committee for Ecumenical and Interreligious Affairs.

In 2016, ISNA and the American Jewish Committee formed the Muslim-Jewish Advisory Council to address rising bigotry against Jews and Muslims in the United States.

Controversies

Alleged extremist ties

Former US Senator Jon Kyl (R-AZ) said that the Islamic Society of North America is "accused of ties to Islamic extremists." Investigative journalist Steven Emerson accused ISNA of ties to terrorism and argued that ISNA is not as moderate as some "would like to believe." Others, such as Rabbi Marc Schneier, argue ISNA and other Islamic groups are too often condemned because of "extreme outliers."

Alleged terrorist financing
ISNA was one of a number of Muslim groups investigated by US law enforcement for possible terrorist connections. Its tax records were requested in December 2003 by the Senate Finance Committee. However, the committee's investigation concluded in November 2005 having found no evidence of ties to terrorists. Committee chairman Charles Grassley said, "We did not find anything alarming enough that required additional follow-up beyond what law enforcement is already doing."

In the 2007 Holy Land Foundation terrorist financing case, the United States Department of Justice named ISNA, along with Council on American-Islamic Relations (CAIR), the North American Islamic Trust (NAIT), as an unindicted co-conspirator and one of a number of "entities who are and/or were members of the US Muslim Brotherhood." ISNA, along with NAIT and CAIR, filed motions seeking to be removed from the UCC listing, and the District Judge found that the government had violated the organizations' rights by listing them as Unindicted Co-Conspirators.

Allegations of Wahhabism
In his testimony before the US Senate in October 2003, Michael Waller referred to ISNA as a Saudi-supported organization, noted that it "certifies Wahhabi-trained chaplains" for U.S. prisons, and argued that it sought to impose "Wahhabi religious conformity" on the American Muslim community.

Other controversies
A speaker at the 2009 national convention, Warith Deen Umar, a New York imam, asserted that the Holocaust happened to the Jews "because they were serially disobedient to Allah." He went on to allege that a group of Jews close to President Barack Obama "control the world". ISNA condemned the comments.

At the July 2017 annual convention of ISNA, representatives from "Muslims for Progressive Values" and Human Rights Campaign (LGBT rights groups) were asked to shut down their booth and leave, given "that the convention was a religious, private, and family-oriented event."

See also
Council on American-Islamic Relations
ISNA Canada

References

External links

ISNA's Mission and Values

Islamic political organizations
Islamic organizations based in the United States
Islamic organizations based in Canada
Islamic organizations established in 1982